Sinhagad is a 1933 Marathi historical fact film directed by V. Shantaram.
The production company was Prabhat Film Company. The story was based on Hari Narayan Apte's literary classic novel "Gad Ala Pan Sinha Gela" (I Won The Fort But Lost A Lion). Apte was a famous Marathi novelist of the early twentieth century. The story's screenplay and dialogue were written by Govindrao Tembe who also provided the music for the film. The cinematographers were V. Avadhoot and Keshavrao Dhaiber. The cast included Master Vinayak, Baburao Pendharkar, Keshavrao Dhaiber, Leela Chandragiri, Shinde, Prabhavati, Budasaheb and Shankarrao Bhosle.

The film though based on the classic, followed the schematic pattern of the earlier silent film version by Baburao Painter Sinhagad (1923), and was based on Maratha Emperor Shivaji's Lieutenant, the Koli folk-hero Tanaji Malusare
The screenplay writer for both films was Narayan Hari Apte.

Plot
Udaybhanu (Baburao Pendharkar) captures Kamlakumari who is planning to commit Sati and brings her to his fort in Kondana. Tanaji Malusare prepares to attack the fort with fifty soldiers. He manages to scale it but is killed in the battle with Udaybhanu. Chatrapati Shivaji maharaj arrives and wins the fort but he is despondent on losing his most trusted Lieutenant.

Cast
 Master Vinayak
 Shankarrao Bhosle as Tanaji Malusure
 Baburao Pendharkar as Udaybhanu
 Kamaladevi
 Bazarbattoo
 G. R. Mane
 Vaghya The Dog
 Miss Kamla Devi
 Ibrahim
 Rahim Miyan
 Keshavrao Dhaiber

Soundtrack
The music director of the film was Govindrao Tembe. The popular songs from the film were Mard Maratha Mawalcha and Jyaachi Kirti Saarya Jagaat.

References

External links

1933 films
Prabhat Film Company films
Films directed by V. Shantaram
1930s Marathi-language films
Films set in the Maratha Empire
Indian black-and-white films
Indian historical drama films
1930s historical drama films
Cultural depictions of Shivaji
1933 drama films